Elim is an unincorporated community and census-designated place (CDP) in Upper Yoder Township, Cambria County, Pennsylvania, United States. The population was 3,727 at the 2010 census, down from 4,175 at the 2000 census.

Geography
Elim is located in southwestern Cambria County at  (40.299124, -78.939873), in the eastern part of Upper Yoder Township. It is bordered by Westmont and Southmont to the north and by Ferndale and the city of Johnstown to the east.

Demographics

As of the census of 2000, there were 4,175 people, 1,580 households, and 1,072 families living in the CDP. The population density was 2,082.5 people per square mile (806.0/km). There were 1,669 housing units at an average density of 832.5/sq mi (322.2/km). The racial makeup of the CDP was 98.11% White, 0.79% African American, 0.10% Native American, 0.55% Asian, 0.07% Pacific Islander, 0.10% from other races, and 0.29% from two or more races. Hispanic or Latino of any race were 0.35% of the population.

There were 1,580 households, out of which 23.6% had children under the age of 18 living with them, 57.2% were married couples living together, 7.7% had a female householder with no husband present, and 32.1% were non-families. 29.1% of all households were made up of individuals, and 16.3% had someone living alone who was 65 years of age or older. The average household size was 2.26 and the average family size was 2.79.

In the CDP, the population was spread out, with 16.6% under the age of 18, 8.8% from 18 to 24, 23.4% from 25 to 44, 23.3% from 45 to 64, and 27.9% who were 65 years of age or older. The median age was 46 years. For every 100 females, there were 87.8 males. For every 100 females age 18 and over, there were 84.8 males.

The median income for a household in the CDP was $36,484, and the median income for a family was $48,496. Males had a median income of $30,794 versus $27,188 for females. The per capita income for the CDP was $18,345. About 6.8% of families and 7.7% of the population were below the poverty line, including 9.3% of those under age 18 and 9.3% of those age 65 or over.

References

Census-designated places in Cambria County, Pennsylvania
Census-designated places in Pennsylvania